The Bogonos Stream is a small river (stream) in Tomsk Oblast, Russia. Its length is about 8 km. It flows into the Oskina River, a basin of the Ob River.

The right bank of the stream is included in the Verkhne-Sorovsky Zakaznik.

References

Sources 
 Лист карты O-45-85. Масштаб: 1 : 100 000.
 Топографическая карта масштаба 1:50000 // ГОСГИСЦЕНТР.

Rivers of Tomsk Oblast
Ob basin